Ricardo L. Hill (born February 14, 1977) is an American former professional basketball player. He played at the small forward and power forward positions.

High school
Hill attended Brother Rice High School, in Chicago, Illinois, where he played high school basketball.

College career
Hill played college basketball at Illinois State University, where he led the Redbirds to back-to-back Missouri Valley Conference championships, as well as consecutive NCAA Tournament appearances, in 1997 and 1998.

Professional career
Hill was selected by the Los Angeles Clippers, with the 31st pick in the 1999 NBA draft, but he never played in the NBA. He played with the Quad City Thunder (CBA), Estudiantes Madrid (Spain), Dakota Wizards (NBA D-League), Le Mans a French team, and the Charleston Lowgators (NBA D-League). He also played in Italy, and with the Chicago Steam of the American Basketball Association, and with for Baloncesto Fuenlabrada (Spain).

Hill was chosen by the Chicago Muscle, with the tenth pick in the 2011 Premier Basketball League Draft.

References

1977 births
Living people
African-American basketball players
American expatriate basketball people in France
American expatriate basketball people in Italy
American expatriate basketball people in the Philippines
American expatriate basketball people in Portugal
American expatriate basketball people in Spain
American expatriate basketball people in Venezuela
American men's basketball players
Basketball players from California
Baloncesto Fuenlabrada players
CB Estudiantes players
Charleston Lowgators players
Dakota Wizards (CBA) players
Fargo-Moorhead Beez (CBA) players
Liga ACB players
Illinois State Redbirds men's basketball players
JDA Dijon Basket players
Le Mans Sarthe Basket players
Los Angeles Clippers draft picks
Marinos B.B.C. players
Philippine Basketball Association imports
Power forwards (basketball)
Quad City Thunder players
S.L. Benfica basketball players
San Miguel Beermen players
Small forwards
Sportspeople from Oceanside, California
21st-century African-American sportspeople
20th-century African-American sportspeople